Under the Whyte notation for the classification of steam locomotives by wheel arrangement, the  is a Garratt articulated locomotive. The wheel arrangement is effectively two 4-8-0 locomotives operating back to back, with the boiler and cab suspended between the two engine units. Each engine unit has two pairs of leading wheels in a leading bogie, followed by four coupled pairs of driving wheels and no trailing wheels. Since the 4-8-0 type is known as a Mastodon type, the corresponding Garratt type would be referred to as a Double Mastodon. A similar wheel arrangement exists for Mallet locomotives, but is referred to as 4-8-8-4.

Overview
The  was the fifth rarest Garratt wheel arrangement, with a total of 26 locomotives constructed.

Usage
All the 4-8-0+0-8-4 Garratts were built by Beyer, Peacock & Company for the  gauge Bengal Nagpur Railway in India. The first 16 were designated Class N and were delivered in 1929, while 10 more arrived in 1931 and were designated class NM. The locomotives had Belpaire fireboxes and piston valves.

Two of the type survive, both of Class N. No. 811 is staged at Kharagpur Workshop, while no. 815 is on display at the National Rail Museum, New Delhi.

References

External links

8,4-8-0
88,4-8-0+0-8-4